Kaviraja Bankidas Ashiya (1771–1833) was a Rajasthani poet and scholar. He was born in a Charan family of Ashiya lineage in the Indian state of Rajasthan.

He was born in 1771 (1828 Vikram Samvat). He has composed between 1803 and 1833. He wrote several religious poems, didactic poems and also on the then situation of the society.

Introduction 
Kaviraja Bankidas Asiya(1771–1833) was born in the village of Bhandiawas of Pachpadra Pargana in Jodhpur state to Fateh Sinhji Ashiya, in AD 1771. He is considered the best poet of the Rajasthani (Dingal) language of his time. Bankidas was the Raj-Kavi of Marwar (Jodhpur) kingdom during the rule of Man Singh of Jodhpur.

He authored 26 books, of which "Bankidas Ri Khyat" is considered his most prominent work. This book was written in a style that was different from the prevalent writing tradition. It is a collection of 2000 commentaries written on the events related to the history of Rajasthan.

Bankidas was considered an Aśu-Kavi, an extempore poet who could compose poetry off-hand (i.e. without preparation). Bankidas is also known as a chronicler of history and a knowledgeable scholar of Sanskrit, Dingal, Prakrit, Persian, and Braj Bhasa.

Career 
Bankidas wrote most of his poetry at the court of the ruler Man Singh of Jodhpur (1803-1843), where he was awarded the title Kaviraja (King-Poet). According to the tradition, Bankidas was the poet-mentor of Man Singh, who also wrote poetry. Bankidas lost favour in Man Singh's eyes when he backed Man Singh's son Chatra Singh in his quest of the throne and got himself exiled and stripped of his land-grant. But, eventually Man Singh forgave Bankidas and reinstated his jagir(feudal holdings) “since he was a Charan”.

Kaviraja Bankidas was accorded considerable fame during his lifetime and by subsequent generations of poets and historians. Thus, much of Bankidas's work and data about his life have been well-researched, in particular through the compilation of his religious poetry, eulogies, and historical prose-chronicles intermixed with poetry published under the title Baṃkidāsa Graṃthavalī, which continues to be an important source for the writing of Rajasthani history.

Concern For The Society 
Kaviraja Bankidas was moved by the poverty and misery of the people of Thali (a tract in North-West Rajasthan) and contrasted it to the cool comforts enjoyed by the ruling elite living in the Puras. He also took note of the prosperity of Jat peasant proprietors and the unfair trade practices of the vaniks (traders).

Anti-Colonial Stance 
Kaviraja Bankidas is considered as one of the last great, traditional poets of the Dingal tradition and one of the first “modern” poets who voiced nationalist sentiments, while employing medieval martial ideals to express anti-British sentiments.

Bankidas witnessed the waning of Mughal dominion and the advance of the British East India Company’s military and political ambitions aimed at administrating large parts of Rajputana.

52 years before the mutiny of 1857 i.e. 1805 AD, Kaviraja wrote  'Chetavani Ro Geet' (Song of the Warning) and called upon the kings of Rajasthan to avoid the mischief of the English. Despite being the Kaviraja of Jodhpur, the indomitable courage and unmatched valor of the Jat rulers of Bharatpur was praised with fair and fearless by him.

Kaviraja Bankidas referred to Kilkatta (Kolkata), Kanpur, Lahore, Madras(Chennai), Mamoi (Mumbai), and Trambak while highlighting the expansionist policy of the Company. Around 1804, In the context of celebrating the anti-British posture adopted by Man Singh of Jodhpur for giving shelter to Madhu Raj Bhonsle of Nagpur, he criticized Maharaja Ranjit Singh of Punjab, who had a earlier refused to do so. He felt that this cowardly act of Ranjit Singh had tarnished the name of the Sikh gurus. He was also aware of the defeat of Tipu Sultan and described it sympathetically as the ruin of the exalted family of Ali Mansur.

In 1805, Kaviraja Bankidas in one of his very popular poem “Aayo Angrez Mulk Re Upar” called upon Hindus and Muslims both worth being called a man to demonstrate bravery against the British.

Works
His composed poems are:
 Moha Mardana: a didactic poem
 Anyokti Panchasika: an allegorical poem on morality
 Krupana Darpana: ridiculing the misers
 Mavadiya Mijaja: criticizing the effeminate persons
 Chugala Mikha Chapetika: poem against sycophants
 Vaisa Varta: poem condemning the prostitution
 Vidura Battisi: on problems of illegitimate of maid-servants and servants
 Duha Ayasaji Maharaja Devanatha Ra: On spiritual teacher of Maharaja Mansingh of Jodhpur
 Jhamala Thakuran Rupsinghji Ra: on Rup singh, the son of Arjun Singh Udawata
 Santosa Bavani: praising virtues of men and condemning their vices
 Dhavala Pachchisi: On heroism, treating the bull as the symbol of hero
 Niti Manjari: a poem on ethics
 Gangalahari

Source:

Further reading 

 Kavirājā Bāṅkidāsa, jīvanī aura sāhitya By Vīrendra Kaviyā · 1989

References 

Poets from Rajasthan
Indian male poets
Rajasthani-language writers
1771 births
1830s deaths
18th-century Indian poets
19th-century Indian poets
19th-century Indian male writers
18th-century male writers
Charan
Dingal poets